Nathan Stapleton (born 1 December 1989) is an Australian professional rugby league footballer who last played for the London Broncos in the Kingstone Press Championship. He previously played for the Cronulla-Sutherland Sharks in the National Rugby League.

Playing career
Born in Deepwater, New South Wales, Stapleton played his junior football for Glen Innes Magpies before being signed by the Cronulla-Sutherland Sharks. He played for Cronulla's NYC team in 2008 and 2009.

In Round 11 of the 2009 NRL season, Stapleton made his NRL debut for Cronulla against rivals St. George Illawarra.

In round 5 of the 2014 NRL season, Stapleton scored 4 tries for Cronulla as they defeated the New Zealand Warriors 37-6 at Shark Park.

On 30 June 2014, Stapleton signed with Sydney Roosters mid-season for the remainder of the year.

On 6 August 2015, Stapleton signed with English franchise London Broncos on a one-year deal beginning in 2016.

Representative career
In 2012, Stapleton played for the Prime Minister's XIII.

Personal life
Stapleton is the younger brother of former rugby union player Brett Stapleton.

Stapleton's mother died of cancer in 2013.

In 2022, Stapleton was taken to hospital after sustaining a neck injury in a rugby union match. He was left paralysed from the shoulders down.

References

External links
2014 Sydney Roosters profile

1989 births
Australian rugby league players
Cronulla-Sutherland Sharks players
Prime Minister's XIII players
Rugby league fullbacks
Rugby league wingers
Rugby league centres
Living people
Rugby league players from New South Wales